Madhusudan Yadav is an Indian Politician from Bharatiya Janta Party. He was a member of the 15th Lok Sabha of India representing the Rajnandgaon constituency of Chhattisgarh.

Political career 
Yadav was first elected to 15th Lok Sabha by defeating Devwrat Singh of Indian National Congress by margin of over 100,000 votes in the 2009 Indian general election. In 2015, he became Mayor of Rajnandgaon Municipal Corporation. He contested 2018 Chhattisgarh Legislative Assembly election from Dongargaon Vidhan Sabha but lost from Daleshwar Singh Sahu of Indian National Congress.

In December 2011, Madhusudan Yadav advocated inclusion of Group C employees under the proposed Jan Lokpal Bill.

See also

List of members of the 15th Lok Sabha of India

References 

1970 births
Living people
Bharatiya Janata Party politicians from Chhattisgarh
People from Rajnandgaon
Lok Sabha members from Chhattisgarh
India MPs 2009–2014